The 2008 Evergrande Real Estate World Team Table Tennis Championships was held in the Guangzhou Gymnasium of Guangzhou, China from February 24 to March 2, 2008. This decision was announced in May 2005. It is the 49th edition to be contested.

Medal summary

Medal table

Events

Results

Men's team

Final

Place 1–12 bracket

Women's team

Final

Place 1–12 bracket

References 
ITTF website
ITTF Database

World Table Tennis Championships
Table tennis competitions in China
World Table Tennis Championships
World Table Tennis Championships
T
A